The 1946 United States House of Representatives elections were elections for the United States House of Representatives to elect members to serve in the 80th United States Congress. They were held for the most part on November 5, 1946, while Maine held theirs on September 9. November 1946 was 19 months after President Harry S. Truman assumed office upon the death of Franklin D. Roosevelt.

Truman was vice president under President Franklin D. Roosevelt and was thrust into the presidency following Roosevelt's death. Truman did not garner the same support as the deceased president. Democrats had controlled Congress since 1931, for 16 years, and Roosevelt had been elected to a record four terms in office. The 1946 election resulted in Republicans picking up 55 seats to win majority control. Joseph Martin, Republican of Massachusetts, became Speaker of the House, exchanging places with Sam Rayburn, Democrat of Texas, who became the new Minority Leader. The Democratic defeat was the largest since they were trounced in the 1928 pro-Republican wave that brought Herbert Hoover to power.

The vote was largely seen as a referendum on Truman, whose approval rating had sunk to 32 percent over the president's controversial handling of a wave of post-war labor strikes, including a United Auto Workers strike against Ford and General Motors in 1945, a United Mine Workers strike starting in April 1946, and a national railroad worker strike that began in May. Further damage resulted from the back-and-forth over whether to end wartime price controls, unpopular with the American business constituency, to handle shortages, particularly in meat and other foodstuffs. While Truman's early months in the White House had been plagued with questions of "What would Roosevelt do if he were alive?" Republicans now began to joke "What would Truman do if he were alive?" and "To err is Truman." The Republican majority was short-lived however, with Democrats winning control of the House two years later.

Overall results

Source: Election Statistics - Office of the Clerk

Special elections 

In these special elections, the winner was seated during 1946 or before January 3, 1947; ordered by election date, then by district.

Alabama

Arizona

Arkansas

California

Colorado

Connecticut

Delaware

Florida

Georgia

Idaho

Illinois

Indiana

Iowa

Kansas

Kentucky

Louisiana

Maine

Maryland

Massachusetts

Michigan

Minnesota

Mississippi

Missouri

Montana

Nebraska

Nevada

New Hampshire

New Jersey

New Mexico

New York

North Carolina

North Dakota

Ohio

Oklahoma

Oregon

Pennsylvania

Rhode Island

South Carolina

South Dakota

Tennessee

Texas

Utah

Vermont

Virginia

Washington

West Virginia

Wisconsin

Wyoming

Non-voting delegates

Alaska Territory

See also
 1946 United States elections
 1946 United States Senate elections
 1946 California's 12th congressional district election (the Richard Nixon-Jerry Voorhis race)
 79th United States Congress
 80th United States Congress

Notes

References